The 2018 Hungarian Ladies Open was a tennis tournament played on indoor hard courts. It was the 22nd edition of the Hungarian Ladies Open, an International-level tournament on the 2018 WTA Tour.

Singles main draw entrants

Seeds 

 1 Rankings are as of 12 February 2018

Other entrants 
The following players received wildcards into the main draw:
  Antonia Lottner
  Fanny Stollár
  Panna Udvardy

The following player received entry using a protected ranking:
  Sabine Lisicki

The following players received entry from the qualifying draw:
  Ysaline Bonaventure
  Jana Čepelová 
  Magdalena Fręch
  Georgina García Pérez
  Arina Rodionova
  Roberta Vinci

The following player received entry as a lucky loser:
  Viktória Kužmová

Withdrawals 
Before the tournament
  Timea Bacsinszky → replaced by  Océane Dodin
  Anna-Lena Friedsam → replaced by  Kateryna Kozlova
  Margarita Gasparyan → replaced by  Pauline Parmentier
  Magda Linette → replaced by  Monica Niculescu
  Kristýna Plíšková → replaced by  Viktória Kužmová
  Magdaléna Rybáriková → replaced by  Lara Arruabarrena

Doubles main draw entrants

Seeds 

1 Rankings are as of 12 February 2018

Other entrants 
The following pairs received wildcards into the doubles main draw:
  Anna Bondár /  Ágnes Bukta
  Dalma Gálfi /  Panna Udvardy

Champions

Singles 

  Alison Van Uytvanck def.  Dominika Cibulková, 6–3, 3–6, 7–5

Doubles 

  Georgina García Pérez /  Fanny Stollár def.  Kirsten Flipkens /  Johanna Larsson, 4–6, 6–4, [10–3]

References

External links 
 

Hungarian Ladies Open
Hungarian Ladies Open
Lad
Hungarian Ladies Open
Buda